The Creighton Bluejays baseball team represents the Creighton University in NCAA Division I college baseball. Creighton competes as a member of the Big East Conference and plays its home games at Charles Schwab Field Omaha. Creighton's baseball team played its first Big East season in 2014. They are coached by Ed Servais.

The team plays its home games at Charles Schwab Field Omaha, also the home of the College World Series, an event which the Bluejays baseball programs serves as the official host school for, providing each of the schools in the tournament practice facilities, training assistance, and assisting with game scoring. Prior to the opening of TD Ameritrade Park, the program played games at the Creighton Sports Complex and Johnny Rosenblatt Stadium in South Omaha, which was also the home of the NCAA College World Series and the Omaha Royals (now known as the Omaha Storm Chasers) of the Pacific Coast League.

1991 College World Series

Creighton appeared in the NCAA College World Series for the only time in 1991.  The Jays advanced to the CWS by defeating the Hawaii Rainbows 15–8 in finals of the NCAA West I Regional in Los Angeles.  Prior to the victory over Hawaii, the Jays swept the four-game regional by beating Pepperdine, Minnesota and host team USC in a 10-inning 8–7 victory.

The seventh-seeded Bluejays (49–20) opened play against the second seeded Clemson Tigers in front of then record crowd of more than 16,000 at Rosenblatt Stadium.  The game ended with an 8–4 Creighton victory, setting up a second round match with MVC rival Wichita State.

The Jays had finished the 1991 regular season with an overall record of 46–18, and a 16–8 record in the Missouri Valley Conference, good enough for second place behind league champion Wichita State. The Shockers had swept the regular season four-game series with the Jays, and had also defeated the Jays twice in the 1991 Missouri Valley Conference Baseball Tournament.

In one of the more memorable games in College World Series history, the Shockers defeated the Jays 3–2 in 12 innings. With one out in the bottom of the twelfth inning Wichita State center fielder Jim Audley threw out Creighton's pinch-runner Steve Bruns at home plate in a play known to Bluejay and Shocker fans alike as "the throw." The game was recently ranked third in the list of the 25 greatest games in College World Series history by the Omaha World-Herald.

The Jays bounced back to defeat Long Beach State 13–4 in an elimination game, to set up a rematch with Wichita State in the National Semifinals. A trip to the title game for Creighton was not to be, however, as Wichita State advanced to the National Championship game after defeating Creighton for the eighth time that season, 11–3.

LSU defeated Wichita State 6–3 to win the 1991 NCAA Baseball National Championship.

The Bluejays Head Coach during that memorable 1991 season, Jim Hendry, is a former General Manager of the Chicago Cubs. Jim Hendry is also the only former Creighton Bluejay to have his number retired. His name and number (25) hang on the center field fence of Creighton Sports Complex.

Notable former Bluejay Baseball players include Hall of Fame inductee Bob Gibson as well as Dave McKay, Pat Venditte, Dennis Rasmussen, Scott Stahoviak, Scott Servais, Zach Daeges, Chad McConnell, Alan Benes and Nicky Lopez.

Team Honors
Big East Conference Regular Season Champions (2): 2014* 2019*

* Outright

Big East Conference Tournament Champions (1): 2019

Missouri Valley Conference Regular Season Champions (2): 2005*, 2011*

* Outright

Missouri Valley Conference Tournament Champions (3): 2007, 2011, 2012

NCAA Regionals Appearances (10): 1973, 1990, 1991, 1992, 1999, 2000, 2005, 2007, 2011, 2012, 2019

College World Series Appearances (1):  1991

Yearly records
The table below reflects the yearly history of the Creighton baseball team. (note official results were not kept until 1966)

References

 
Baseball teams established in 1951
1951 establishments in Nebraska